Cape Philippi is a rock cape rising abruptly to 490 m along the coast of Victoria Land, marking the north side of the terminus of David Glacier. Discovered by the British Antarctic Expedition, 1907–09, under Shackleton, who named this feature for Emil Philippi, distinguished geologist, who was a member of the German Antarctic Expedition, 1901–03, under Drygalski.

Headlands of Victoria Land
Scott Coast